Clifton A. Howes (1860–1936) was an American philatelist who signed the Roll of Distinguished Philatelists in 1921. He was president of the American Philatelic Society from 1915 to 1917.

References

American philatelists
1860 births
1936 deaths
Signatories to the Roll of Distinguished Philatelists